Jorge Calles-Escandon (born 11 November 1951) is a Mexican-American physician and researcher who practices at the MetroHealth Medical Center in Cleveland, Ohio. Calles-Escandon is a prominent endocrinologist, researcher, educator, and speaker.

Personal 
Calles-Escandon was born in Mexico City 1951, Mexico. He is the Director of the Center for Diabetes and Obesity of MetroHealth.

Education
Calles-Escandon received a medical degree from the National Autonomous University of Mexico 1976.

Career

References

1951 births
Living people
American medical researchers
Mexican endocrinologists
American people of Mexican descent
National Autonomous University of Mexico alumni